Sun Yat-sen University (abbreviated SYSU and colloquially known in Chinese as Zhongda), also known as Zhongshan University, is a national key public research university located in Guangzhou, Guangdong, China. It was founded in 1924 by and named after Sun Yat-sen, a revolutionary and the founder of the Republic of China. Its main campus, commonly referred to as the South Campus, is located in Haizhu District, Guangzhou, inheriting the campus from the former Lingnan University (est. 1888). The university has five campuses in the three cities of Guangzhou, Zhuhai and Shenzhen, and ten affiliated hospitals. It is a member of the nation's Double First Class University Plan, Project 985, and Project 211 for leading research universities.

Two of the university's business education institutions, Sun Yat-sen Business School (SYSBS) and Lingnan (University) College are accredited by EQUIS, AACSB, and AMBA. It is the only university with multiple business institutions to hold this triple accreditation. Lingnan (University) College is No.1 in Asia-Pacific for both Financial Times (FT) Business School Rankings and World University Rankings (QS) Business Masters Rankings. The university's assets include the world's second fastest supercomputer Tianhe-2, which is valued at 2.4 billion CNY (US$390 million). It also owns the largest hospital system in China. SYSU Zhuhai Campus owns the largest teaching building in Asia measured by acreage.

Sun Yat-sen University ranks 79th globally, 11th in Asia and 7th in mainland China in the 2022 Academic Ranking of World Universities. SYSU ranked 129th globally, 20th in Asia and 10th in mainland China by the 2023 U.S. News & World Report Best Global Universities Rankings. Regarding scientific research output, the Nature Index 2022 ranked SYSU the No.10 university in the Asia Pacific region, and 18th in the world among the global universities. Its programs in business, management, mathematics, physics, chemistry, biology, medicine and pharmacy are among the best in the nation. SYSU is a highly selective university that only accepts top 1% students performed in the National College Entrance Examination.

History

In the beginning each the Sun Yat-sen Universities were adopted a statism educational model and based on Sun Yat-sen's political philosophy, present-day Sun Yat-sen University is the result of multiple mergers as well as splits and restructurings that have involved more than a dozen academic institutions over time. The most recent merger happened in 2001, when Sun Yat-sen University of Medical Science merged with Sun Yat-sen University and became Sun Yat-sen College of Medical Science.

Sun Yat-sen University
In 1924, Sun Yat-sen founded  National Kwangtung University  in Canton and inscribed in his own handwriting the school motto of "Study Extensively, Enquire Accurately, Reflect Carefully, Discriminate Clearly, Practise Earnestly." After the death of Sun Yat-sen, the Nationalist government that was set up during the first cooperation between the Communists and Nationalists formally decreed to change its name to  National Sun Yat-sen University on July 17, 1926, in memory of Sun Yat-sen. In 1926, there were four National Sun Yat-sen Universities: National First Sun Yat-sen University in Canton (the current Sun Yat-sen University), National Second Sun Yat-sen University in Wuhan (the current Wuhan University), National Third Sun Yat-sen University in Hangzhou (the current Zhejiang University), National Fourth Sun Yat-sen University in Nanking (the predecessor of the current Nanjing University, Southeast University, and National Central University). The Nationalist government also planned to organize the National Fifth Sun Yat-sen University in Zhengzhou, but end up naming it as the Henan Provincial Sun Yat-sen University (the current Henan University).

In the 1930s, there were seven schools in the University: the Schools of Arts, Sciences, Law, Engineering, Agricultural Studies, Medicine and Education. In 1935, National Sun Yat-sen University, concurrently with National Tsinghua University and National Peking University, set up the first graduate schools in China and began to enroll graduate students.

Soon after the Chinese Communist Party took over Canton in 1949, the University removed its prefix "National" and has been thereafter referred directly to  Sun Yat-sen University . In the 1950s, colleges, schools and departments were readjusted nationwide, and Sun Yat-sen University became a national top-tier comprehensive university with the liberal arts and sciences as its backbone disciplines.

Sun Yat-sen University of Medical Sciences
One of the predecessors of the Sun Yat-sen University of Medical Science was the Pok Tsai Medical School, which, founded in 1866, was the earliest institution of learning of western medicine in China, where Sun Yat-sen once studied and engaged in revolutionary activities. The Pok Tsai Medical School evolved into the College of Medicine of Lingnan University in 1936. The Kung Yee Medical School and Hospital in Guangzhou (Canton) was founded in 1908. In 1925, the Kung Yee institutions were taken over by the government and became the Medical Department of the National First Sun Yat-sen (Zhongshan) University. In 1953, the Colleges of Medicine in Sun Yat-sen University and Lingnan University merged to form the College of Medicine of South China, which was joined by the Guangdong Guanghua College of Medicine in 1954. The university was renamed Guangzhou College of Medicine and Sun Yat-sen College of Medical Science successively, and finally Sun Yat-sen University of Medical Science in 1985, which has developed steadfastly into a comprehensive medical university with multi-schools and multiple levels, has reached national advanced level and achieved remarkable successes in scientific research in medical genetics, ophthalmology, tumor study, parasite study, the kidney disease of internal medicine, organ transplant, infectious liver disease, biological medical project and molecular medical science. In 2001, Sun Yat-sen University of Medical Science merged with Sun Yat-sen University and became Sun Yat-sen College of Medical Science.

Lingnan University

Lingnan University (Chinese: 嶺南大學) was a private university established by Andrew Happer, MD and a group of American missionaries in Guangzhou in 1888. At its founding it was named Canton Christian College. 
 
The Hackett Medical College for Women (夏葛女子醫學院, the first medical college for women in China) and its affiliated hospital known as David Gregg Hospital for Women and Children, located in Guangzhou, China, were parts of a medical center that was founded by female medical missionary Mary H. Fulton (1854-1927). Fulton was sent by the Foreign Missions Board of the Presbyterian Church (USA), with the support of the Lafayette Avenue Presbyterian Church of Brooklyn, New York, of which David Gregg was pastor  The college was dedicated in 1902 and offered a four-year medical curriculum.  At the end of 1932, the medical center was registered and put under the control of the Chinese government.  Furthermore, it affiliated with Guangzhou Hospital and Lingnan University to form the Sun Yat-Sen Medical College in 1936.

Lingnan University was incorporated into Sun Yat-sen University in 1953 under the order of the Communist Party's government. Members of the university moved to Hong Kong and founded the Lingnan School in Wan Chai in 1967, which was relocated to Tuen Mun in the mid-1990s and renamed Lingnan University in 1999.
In 1988, Lingnan College was reestablished within Sun Yat-sen University and is now one of the top schools of economics and management in China.

Rankings and reputation
Sun Yat-sen University is ranked as one of the top universities in China by all the most influential and widely observed international university rankings, for example, #7 nationwide in Times Higher Education World University Rankings 2015, #6 nationwide in the Academic Ranking of World Universities 2015, and #8 nationwide in U.S. News Global University Ranking 2015.

The Times Higher Education 2011 placed Sun Yat-sen University 171st in the world and 5th in China,  and the university is regarded as one of the most reputable Chinese universities by the Times Higher Education World Reputation Rankings where it ranked 151st globally. Sun Yat-sen graduates employability rankings placed at #191 in the world in the QS Graduate Employability Rankings.

As of 2022. out of all universities worldwide, the university is ranked #79 by the Academic Ranking of World Universities, #129 by U.S. News Global University Ranking, #130 by Center for World University Rankings, #260 by QS World University Rankings, and #251-300 by Times Higher Education.

Regarding scientific research output, the Nature Index 2022 ranked SYSU the No.10 university in the Asia Pacific region, and 18th in the world among the global universities.

Academics

Statistics (2018)

Schools and Departments (2018) 

The university's Schools & Departments are as follows:

Guangzhou Campuses 

 Academy of Entrepreneurship
 Department of Psychology
 Department of Social Science Education
 Faculty of English Education
 Guanghua School of Stomatology, Hospital of Stomatology, Sun Yat-sen University
 Institute for Advanced Studies in Humanities
 Liberal Arts College (Boya College)
 University General Education Unit
 International Business School
 Department of Applied Economics
 Department of Business Administration 
 Liberal Arts College
 Lingnan (University) College
 Department of Economics
 Department of Finance
 Department of Insurance and Risk Management
 Department of International Business
 Department of Logistics Engineering and Management
 School of Advanced Computing
 School of Asian-Pacific Studies
 Department of International Politics
 School of Chemistry and Chemical Engineering
 Department of Polymer and Material Science
 Department of Chemical Engineering
 Department of Chemistry
 Department of Applied Chemistry
 School of Chinese as a Second Language
 School of Communication and Design
 Department of Public Communication
 Department of Journalism
 Department of Creative Media Design
 School of Continuing Education (School of Online Education)
 School of Earth Science and Geological Engineering
 School of Education
 School of Engineering
 School of Environmental Science and Engineering
 School of Foreign Languages
 School of Geography and Planning
 School of Government
 Department of Political Sciences
 Department of Public Management
 School of Humanities
 Department of Chinese
 Department of History
 Department of Philosophy
 School of Information Management
 School of Information Science and Technology
 School of Intellectual Property
 School of International Studies
 School of Law
 School of Life Sciences
 School of Marine Sciences
 School of Mathematics & Computational Science
 School of Mobile Information Engineering
 School of Nursing
 School of Pharmaceutical Sciences
 School of Physics
 School of Physics and Astronomy
 School of Public Health
 School of Sociology and Anthropology
 Department of Anthropology
 Department of Sociology and Social Work
 School of Software
 School of Tourism Management
 Sino-French Institute of Nuclear Engineering and Technology
 Sun Yat-sen Business School
 SYSU-CMU Joint Institute of Engineering
 University General Education Unit
 YAT-SEN School
 Zhongshan School of Medicine

Shenzhen Campus 

School of Medicine (Shenzhen)
School of Public Health (Shenzhen)
School of Pharmaceutical Science (Shenzhen)
School of Medical Engineering (Shenzhen)
School of Materials
School of Aeronautics and Astronautics
School of Intelligent Systems Engineering
School of Electronics and Communication Engineering

International institutes 
The university also consists of various other international institutes such as:
Joint Institute of Engineering (JIE), developed together with Carnegie Mellon University 
Medical Research Center for Clinical and Translational Research, partnered with Johns Hopkins University
Lehn Institute of Functional Materials (LIFM), developed together with the Laboratory of Supramolecular Chemistry at ISIS of University of Strasbourg, INT of Karlsruhe Institute of Technology and ETH Zurich
The Sino-French Institute of Nuclear Engineering & Technology, developed together with Grenoble Institute of Technology, Ecole des mines de Nantes, Chimie ParisTech, École nationale supérieure de chimie de Montpellier, Institut national des sciences et techniques nucléaires
SYSU-Alberta Joint Lab for Biodiversity Conservation, established together with University of Alberta, Canada
The Chinese University of Hong Kong - Sun Yat-sen University Centre for Historical Anthropology
Center on Philanthropy at Sun Yat-sen university, partnered with Indiana University

Business Education

Sun Yat-sen Business School (SYSBS)
Sun Yat-sen Business School (SYSBS) is one of the only 3 business schools in mainland China and one of 58 business schools in the world being triple accredited by EQUIS, AACSB and AMBA.

The school has established collaborative academic exchanges and programs with over 80 international institutions, such as University of California, Los Angeles, University of Oxford, University of Hawaii at Manoa, Queen's University, IE Business School, City University of Hong Kong and so on. It has also built strategic partnerships with leading multinational companies, such as IBM, DHL, Coca-Cola, Allianz Group and so on, and with a myriad of local partners such as ICBC, Bank of China.

In 2012, Forbes China ranked the schools's MBA program #7 in China.
In 2012, Financial Times ranked the school's EMBA programs #11 worldwide.
In 2013, Financial Times ranked the school's Master in Management Program #44 worldwide.

Lingnan (University) College

Since 2015, Lingnan (University) college is also triple-accredited by AACSB, EQUIS and AMBA. The college is originated from Lingnan University, a renowned private university established by a group of American missionaries in 1888.

Its programs include Lingnan-MIT International MBA program with MIT Sloan School of Management, the China Executive MBA program with Carlson School of Management of the University of Minnesota, the China-France MBA program with Jean Moulin University Lyon 3 and EMLYON Business School, and the International DBA program with EMLYON Business School.

Lingnan-MIT IMBA
The Lingnan IMBA is the first English-taught MBA program in China, which is in cooperation with the Sloan School of Management at the Massachusetts Institute of Technology (MIT). The IMBA program adopts MIT Sloan's MBA curricula, textbooks, cases, and other teaching materials. During the first semester, Lingnan students have the opportunity to apply to MIT Sloan's MSMS program. Through this two-year, dual-degree program, students can earn an international MBA from Lingnan and a master's degree in management studies from MIT Sloan. 
In 2008, Manager ranked Lingnan-MBA #5 in “Best MBA Programs in China” rankings.
In 2012, Forbes China ranked the schools's MBA program #8 in China.

Dual Degrees
Lingnan University's MBA Students have also have double degree options with ESCP Europe, Rotterdam School of Management, Erasmus University.

Affiliated hospitals

The university has the largest affiliated hospital system in China, including Sun Yat-sen University First Hospital, Sun Yat-sen Memorial Hospital (or Sun Yat-sen University Second Hospital), Sun Yat-sen University Third Hospital, Sun Yat-sen University Fourth Hospital (has merged into the First Hospital), Sun Yat-sen University Fifth Hospital (or Zhuhai Hospital), Sun Yat-sen University Sixth Hospital (or Sun Yat-sen University Gastrointestinal & Anal Hospital), Sun Yat-sen University Cancer Center, Sun Yat-sen University Stomatologic Hospital, Sun Yat-sen University Ophthalmologic Center, Sun Yat-sen University Seventh Hospital (Shenzhen), Sun Yat-sen University Eighth Hospital (Shenzhen). All eight general hospitals, the Sun Yat-sen University Cancer Center and Sun Yat-sen University Ophthalmology Center are 3A class hospitals.

The First Affiliated Hospital, SYSU
The First Affiliated Hospital, Sun Yat-sen University was established in 1910, initially called the Affiliated Hospital of Guangdong Public Institution of Medicine. As a 3A hospital (the top level in China), the hospital is the largest and the most comprehensive one among all affiliated hospitals of SYSU, as well as one of the largest hospitals in the country.

Sun Yat-sen University First Hospital is ranked #2 in "Top 10 General Hospital in China" rankings.

Sun Yat-Sen Memorial Hospital, SYSU
Founded as Ophthalmic Hospital in Canton by American Peter Parker in 1835. It originally dealt with diseases of the eye, but later treated other ailments. It later became the Canton Hospital.

Sun Yat-sen University Cancer Center
Sun Yat-sen University Cancer Center is a level III (highest rank in China) and class A hospital. It was awarded as “key subject of China” in 2001. In 1980, SYSUCC was designated as World Health Organization (WHO) Collaborating Center for research on cancer. Since 2003, SYSUCC became a sister institution of the University of Texas MD Anderson Cancer Center. In 2004, SYSUCC has set up a joint laboratory with Karolinska Institutet of Sweden for research in immunotherapy, molecular virology and oncological epidemiology.

Sun Yat-sen University Cancer Center is ranked #1 in "Top 10 Cancer Hospitals in China" rankings.

Sun Yat-sen University Ophthalmologic Center
Sun Yat-sen University Ophthalmologic Center is the first and leading advanced ophthalmic center and the last resort for advanced eye care in China, integrating eye care, teaching, eye research and blindness prevention. It is also one of the 20 largest general ophthalmic centers in the world. In 2006, Sun Yat-sen University Ophthalmic Center was approved to be the State Key Laboratory of Ophthalmology, the only one of its kind in China.

Sun Yat-sen University Ophthalmologic Center is ranked #1 in "Best Ophthalmologic Hospitals in China" rankings.

Sun Yat-sen University Libraries
The university's system of libraries is one of the largest in China. By December 2012, it held more than 6 million paper volumes, including periodicals.

The Hilles Collection
In June 2005, Harvard College Library of Harvard University donated 158,000 volumes in Hilles Library to Sun Yat-sen University. Developed over a century, the collection is composed of titles in the humanities and social sciences, primarily in English, but also in Western foreign languages.

Confucius Institutes
Sun Yat-sen University has established five Confucius Institutes since 2006: 
The Confucius Institute at Ateneo de Manila University
The Confucius Institute in Indianapolis, established together with Indiana University-Purdue University Indianapolis
The Confucius Institute at Autonomous University of Yucatan 
The Confucius Institute in Lyon, established together with Lumière University Lyon 2 and Jean Moulin University Lyon 3 
The Confucius Institute at University of Cape Town.

Research

Essential Science Indicators (ESI)
According to statistics of the Essential Science Indicators (ESI) database from January 2003 to February 2013, the total number of citations of papers in 15 disciplines of Sun Yat-sen University entered global top 1%. Following Peking University, Sun Yat-sen University ranked 2nd in universities in China, tied with Fudan University, Shanghai Jiao Tong University and Zhejiang University. The 15 disciplines include Chemistry, Clinical Medicine, Physics, Biology and Biochemistry, Materials Science, Molecular Biology & Genetics, Engineering, Plant and Animal Science, Environment/Ecology, Pharmacology & Toxicology, Neuroscience & Behavior, Mathematics, Microbiology, Agricultural Sciences, and Social Sciences, General.

Nature Publishing Index (NPI)
Nature Publishing Index shows both Research Articles (Articles, Letters & Brief Communications) and Reviews, published in Nature and/or Nature research journals. The rankings are based on the number of papers that were published during the last 12 months. In time range of 01.07.2013-06.30.2014, Sun Yat-sen University is ranked #5 among Chinese Universities.

Postdoctoral Research Stations
Sun Yat-sen University has 39 postdoctoral research stations.

Journals
Sun Yat-sen University publishes altogether 25 scholarly journals, including
Acta Scientiarum Naturalium Universitatis Sunyatseni
Journey of Sun Yat-sen University Social Science Edition
Journey of Sun Yat-sen University (medical science)
Diagnostic Imaging & Interventional Radiology (in Chinese)
Modern Clinical Nursing (in Chinese)
New Medicine (in Chinese)
Chinese Journal of Nervous and Mental Diseases (in Chinese)
Chinese Journal of Cancer
Eye Science

Campuses

Guangzhou South Campus
The south campus of Sun Yat-sen University is located in Haizhu District, Guangzhou, and covers a total area of 1.17 square kilometers. It mainly hosts disciplines in sciences and humanities.

Add: No. 135, Xingang Road West, Guangzhou 510275, P. R. China

Guangzhou North Campus
The North Campus is located in Yuexiu District, Guangzhou, and covers an area of 0.39 square kilometers. It is a campus mainly for disciplines in medical sciences.

Add: No. 74, Zhongshan 2nd Road, Guangzhou 510085, P. R. China

Guangzhou East Campus
The East Campus is located at the north end of the Guangzhou Higher Education Mega Center in Xiaoguwei, Panyu, and covers an area of 1.13 square kilometers. The Guangzhou University City is a major development made by the People's Government of Guangdong Province in an effort to implement the strategy of building Guangdong through science and education. The first batch of students started school there in September 2004.

Add: Xiaoguwei Island, Panyu District, Guangzhou 510006, P. R. China

Zhuhai Campus
The Zhuhai Campus is located at Tang Jia Wan, Zhuhai City, and covers an area of 3.48 square kilometers. Freshmen and sophomores of some disciplines in liberal arts, natural sciences, and medical sciences are currently living and studying on campus with students from the School of Network Education and Continuing Education.

Add: Tang Jia Wan, Zhuhai 519082, P. R. China

Shenzhen Campus
The Shenzhen Campus is located at Guangming District in Shenzhen City, and covers an area of 3.217 square kilometers, it's under construction from 2016 and proposed to open at September 2018.

Add: Guangming District, Shenzhen 518107, P. R. China

Alumni 

Sonia Chan, 2nd Secretary for Administration and Justice of Macau
Fang Fenglei, former deputy director of China International Capital Corporation and Chairman of Goldman Sachs China
Li Fanghua, physicist
Shiu-Ying Hu, botanist
Huang Huahua, former Governor of Guangdong
Muzi Mei, blogger
Xu Ningsheng, 21st President of Fudan University
Xu Ze, politician
Ye Shuhua, astronomer
Xu Yinchuan, former world xiangqi (Chinese chess) champion
Shou-Wu Zhang, Chinese-American mathematician
Yingying Zhang, researcher on photosynthesis and crop productivity
Zhang Huaicun, artist and writer of children's books
Guotai Zhou, major general of the People's Liberation Army
Ye Shuhua, prominent astronomer
Tsang Hin-chi, entrepreneur and politician, founder of the Goldlion Group
Lai Minhua, Director General of Macao Customs Service

See also

Sun Yat-sen University (disambiguation)
National Sun Yat-sen University in Taiwan, Republic of China
Moscow Sun Yat-sen University in Moscow, Russia
Lingnan College (in Chinese)
US-China University Presidents Roundtable

References

External links 

Official Website
  
Information about SYSU at Yale-China Association
The Guide to Red Brick Buildings 1: Public Buildings of the Early Architectural Complex on Honglok Campus
The Guide to Red Brick Buildings 2: Lodges of the Early Architectural Complex on Honglok Campus

 
Educational institutions established in 1924
Guangzhou Higher Education Mega Center
Haizhu District
Project 211
Project 985
Sun Yat-sen
Universities and colleges in Guangzhou
Universities in China with English-medium medical schools
Zhuhai
Vice-ministerial universities in China
1924 establishments in China